Walter Evans (September 18, 1842 – December 30, 1923) was a United States representative from Kentucky and a United States district judge of the United States District Court for the District of Kentucky and of the United States District Court for the Western District of Kentucky.

Education and career

Born on September 18, 1842, in Glasgow, Barren County, Kentucky, Evans attended the public schools near Harrodsburg, Kentucky. He moved to Hopkinsville, Christian County, Kentucky and served as deputy county clerk in 1859. He served in the Union Army from 1861 to 1863. He served as deputy and later chief clerk of the circuit court. He read law and was admitted to the bar in 1864. He entered private practice in Hopkinsville from 1864 to 1871. He was a delegate to the Republican National Conventions in 1868, 1872, 1880 and 1884. He was a member of the Kentucky House of Representatives from 1871 to 1873. He was a member of the Kentucky Senate from 1873 to 1875. He resumed private practice in Louisville, Kentucky from 1875 to 1883. He was an unsuccessful candidate for election to the 45th United States Congress in 1876. He was the Republican nominee for Governor of Kentucky in 1879. He was appointed Commissioner of the Bureau of Internal Revenue (now the Internal Revenue Service) of the United States Department of the Treasury by President Chester Arthur, serving from May 21, 1883 to April 20, 1885. He returned to private practice in Louisville from 1885 to 1895.

Congressional service

Evans was elected as a Republican from Kentucky's 5th congressional district to the United States House of Representatives of the 54th and 55th United States Congresses, serving from March 4, 1895, to March 3, 1899. He was an unsuccessful candidate for reelection in 1898 to the 56th United States Congress.

Federal judicial service

Evans was nominated by President William McKinley on March 3, 1899, to a seat on the United States District Court for the District of Kentucky vacated by Judge John W. Barr. He was confirmed by the United States Senate on March 3, 1899, and received his commission the same day. Evans was reassigned by operation of law to the United States District Court for the Western District of Kentucky on July 1, 1901, to a new seat authorized by 31 Stat. 781. His service terminated on December 30, 1923, due to his death in Louisville, Jefferson County, Kentucky. He was interred in Cave Hill Cemetery in Louisville.

Family

Evans was the nephew of United States Representative Burwell C. Ritter.

References

Sources

External links

 

1842 births
1923 deaths
Kentucky lawyers
Union Army officers
People of Kentucky in the American Civil War
Judges of the United States District Court for the District of Kentucky
Commissioners of Internal Revenue
Burials at Cave Hill Cemetery
United States federal judges appointed by William McKinley
Judges of the United States District Court for the Western District of Kentucky
People from Barren County, Kentucky
Republican Party members of the Kentucky House of Representatives
Republican Party Kentucky state senators
Republican Party members of the United States House of Representatives from Kentucky
Politicians from Louisville, Kentucky
United States federal judges admitted to the practice of law by reading law
19th-century American politicians
19th-century American judges
20th-century American judges